C. Blake Doriot is an American politician, businessman, and land surveyor serving as a member of the Indiana Senate from the 12th district. He assumed office on November 9, 2016.

Early life and education 
Doriot is a native of Elkhart County, Indiana. He earned a Bachelor of Science degree in construction from Purdue University in 1982.

Career 
After graduating from college, Doriot became a land surveyor. He is licensed to work in Indiana, Wisconsin, and Ohio. Doriot served as the surveyor of Elkhart County for 24 years. He also owns B Doriot & Associates Land Surveying. Doriot was elected to the Indiana Senate in November 2016. Since 2019, he has also served as ranking member of the Senate Pensions and Labor Committee.

References 

Living people
American surveyors
Republican Party Indiana state senators
Purdue University alumni
People from Elkhart County, Indiana
Year of birth missing (living people)